Indentation is the placement of text farther to the right, or left, to separate it from surrounding text.

It may also refer to:
 Indentation style, in programming a convention governing the indentation of blocks of code to convey the program's structure
 Indentation hardness, determining the hardness of a material to deformation
 Indenting agent, person or company that purchases goods on behalf of another party

See also
 Indent (disambiguation)